Many Neighborhoods of Toledo, Ohio are of historic interest.

Commonly used indicators like South Toledo can be misleading, since these indicators are most likely based on the original plan of Downtown Toledo, North is really Northeast, South is really Southwest, West is really Northwest, and East is really Southeast.

Neighborhoods
Arlington (South)
Auburndale:  A large neighborhood in central-west Toledo, generally bounded by Monroe Street on the north, the Norfolk & Southern Railroad on the east, Oakwood Street and W. Bancroft on the south and Torrey Hill on the west.  
Beverly (South) is a quiet suburban-like neighborhood.
Birmingham: (East) is a neighborhood formerly inhabited almost exclusively by Hungarian immigrants.
Crossgates: (South)
St. Peter's & St.Pauls Catholic School & Church on St.Claire Street.~Now Only The Church is active. the School of St Peter & Pauls & St.James Catholic School from Colburn St.Merged with Immaculate Conception/Darby to Keep a South-End Catholic School Available to All Catholic's living in the Old South End.
DeVeaux (West)
Downtown: (Central) is an area of development, after many years of being largely considered to be a ghost town.
Darby: A former Irish section of the Old South End. The Immaculate Conception Church of Darby forms it’s center extending to South Ave. 
Englewood: Part of the Old West End.  Generally bounded by W. Bancroft on the north, Lawrence Avenue on the east, Oakwood Avenue on the south and N. Detroit on the west.    
Five Points: (North/West) Designated because of the intersections of Sylvania Ave, Lewis Ave, Phillips Ave and Martha Dr.	
Glendale-Heatherdowns (Byrne-Heatherdowns Village): Located in South Toledo, this area is an example of a classic post-WWII neighborhood. Curvilinear, tree-lined streets surround many parks. 
Harvard Terrace: (South Toledo) is a historic neighborhood along the Maumee River neighbored by the Toledo Zoo and Walbridge Park.
Highland Heights: is a neighborhood, primarily in South Toledo, spanning from Dorr St at it northern border to the Anthony Wayne Trail along the southeastern border.
Lagrange (The Polish Village): (Central/North) is a neighborhood formerly known for its almost exclusively Polish population; has an annual Polish festival.
Library Village: (North/West) is a historic neighborhood featuring smaller and more affordable homes than some historic neighborhoods.
North River (Central/North): Vistula, Toledo's first neighborhood, is part of the North River neighborhood.
Old Orchard: (West) is a neighborhood neighboring the University of Toledo and Ottawa Hills.
Old South End: (Central/South)
Old Town: (Central)
Old West End: (Central/West) is a collection of stately Victorian and Arts and Crafts architecture; The Old West End is on the National Register of Historic Places.
ONYX: (Central) is a neighborhood that includes Lenk's Hill, a former German enclave, to the east  and part of Kushwantz, a former Polish enclave, to the west.
Point Place: (North) annexed in 1937, this neighborhood is surrounded by water: Maumee Bay, Maumee River, Ottawa River... but many of the homes are unremarkable likely because the area was prone to flooding before the dikes were put in.
Reynolds Corners: (South/West) was annexed along with the remainder of Adams Township in 1966.
Scott Park: (Central/West): The University of Toledo Scott Park Campus is located in this neighborhood. The eastern portion of this neighborhood was part of the former Polish enclave, Kushwantz.			
Southwyck: (South):
Vistula (North)
Warehouse District: (Central) is a mix of in-use warehouses, lofts, restaurants, art studios, venues, etc. and has seen a huge renaissance within the last decade.
Warren-Sherman: (Central): a former German enclave, now Mercy St. Vincent's Medical Center is the centerpiece of the neighborhood.
Westgate: (West):
Westmoreland: (West) is a historic neighborhood that is listed on the National Register of Historic Places.
Whitney Hills encompasses the area bounded approximately by the streets Jermain, Wellesley, Sagamore (formerly Floramond), Inwood, Appledore, The Glen, and North Cove Blvd.) The area was once owned by a Judge named Herbert Whitney, formed from his family's farmland. He was an influential member of Toledo society, education and church life, who lived with his wife Louise, in a large home on the corner of Inwood and The Glen. Judge Whitney's family farm was developed into Jermain Park and Ottawa Park, along with an area formed by a number of the most classic streets in the old city. By the 1960s Whitney Hills and surrounding neighborhoods had been developed into a large suburb that included McKinley Elementary School, which fed into DeVilbiss High School.

References